Chinese Paladin 5 (Chinese: 仙剑云之凡) is a 2016 Chinese television series adapted from the action role-playing game of the same name by Softstar Entertainment. The series is produced by Chinese Entertainment Shanghai and stars Elvis Han, Guli Nazha, Joe Cheng, Yang Caiqi, Gina Jin and Geng Le. It was first aired on Hunan TV from 23 May to 19 July 2016.

Synopsis 
Jiang Yunfan (Elvis Han), the son of a demon lord, becomes entangled in the fight between the human realm and Netherworld when the gate between both realms are threatened. Along the way, he meets Tang Yurou (Guli Nazha), a beautiful but sickly girl that has a mysterious condition and who teaches him about love and sacrifice. He also encounters Long You (Joe Cheng), the second prince of a demon tribe of questionable origins who is searching for his brother as well as Xiao Man (Yang Caiqi), the descendant of Nuwa seeking a stolen artifact. Yun Fan ends up developing friendships and relationships on his journey. However, his father, the demon king is going to be killed by gods and goddesses on earth to release his demon power. Yun Fan thus becomes embroiled in the conflict between good and evil. He has to choose in saving his father or aiding the immortals in killing him permanently.

Cast

Main
 Elvis Han as Jiang Yunfan 
Son of the Demon Lord and human Mother. After the passing of his mother, Yunfan is sent to reside at Gale Fortress also known as his second family, home to mountain bandits. A series of events occur, causing him to become a disciple of Sage Yi Pin at Mt Shu. Throughout the journey, he befriends Long You, Xiao Man and develops a special relationship with Yurou. 
 Guli Nazha as Tang Yurou
A disciple of Sage Cao Gu of Mt Shu, Yurou has talent in medicine and bears an unusual illness since her birth causing her to have a short lifespan. She ventures on a journey with her friends Yunfan, Long You and Xiao Man.
Joe Cheng as Long You 
The 2nd prince and future king of the demon realm. He leaves his realm to find his long lost brother Long Ming, save the Demon Lord and to save the demon realm from serious drought. He becomes a disciple of Sage Yu Shu at Mt Shu. On the way he befriends Yunfan, Xiao Man and Yurou. He is fond of Xiao Man and Ling Yin.
Yang Caiqi as Xiao Man 
A descendant of Goddess Nuwa, grand daughter of Sage Yi Pin and disciple of Lady Hai Tang. She is a lovely adorable girl who is not afraid of doing what it takes to save the world from harm. Along the journey, she meets Long You, Yunfan and Yurou and becomes their main source of help. She is especially close with Long You.
Gina Jin as Ling Yin / Ling Bo
Chai Wei as teen Ling Yin 
One of the seven sages at Mt Shu and sister of Ling Bo. She is a righteous woman and always has a reason for her actions. Due to the il-fated relationship between her sister and Long Ming, she resents all demons. However, she later likes Long You. 
Geng Le as Jiang Shili 
The Demon Lord of Clear Sky Sect and biological father of Yunfan. He was captured and sealed in a stone made of Nuwa’s blood for 20 years in Mt Shu and has a revengeful personality.

Supporting

Sages of Mt Shu
Canti Lau as Yi Pin (Li Xiaoyao)
Deng Limin as Tai Wu 
[[Guo Xiaoting] as Cao Gu 
Yang Tie as Qing Shi 
Zhang Xiang as Yu Shu 
Lu Senbao as Tie Bi

Others 
Cya Liu as Fang Caiwei 
Yunfan's god sister and friend from Gale Fortress 
Jing Chao as Long Ming 
Long You's older brother and 1st prince of the demon realm
Wu Jianfei as Shangguan Ya
Yunfan's enemy who loves Yurou  
Che Yongli as Ouyang Qian 
Wang Xuanyu as Ouyang Hui 
Han Dong as Xia Gulin
Li Yuan as Lin Weiyang 
Ye Qing as Yu Chang
Zhang Rui as Zhu Youya
Wang Zhixuan as Du Ying 
Zhang Lei as Huangfu Zuo
Song Ning as Xie Shou
Yin Zhusheng as Mo Yi
Wang Yansu as Lady Hai Tang 
Guardian of Goddess Nuwa in Miao Jing
Ren Xuehai as Xia Houzhang 
Wang Chunyuan as Yin Qilei
Meng Weiming as Fang Yongsi 
Cui Kefa as Ouyang Ying
Su Mao as Tang Hai
Zhang Ruijia as Yu Jiaohong 
Xi Meijuan as A Zhu's mother
Sun Yaoqi as Heng Wenwen
A disciple at Mt Shu who likes Yunfan
Li Sicheng as Yi Xiaodan
Wang Yilin as Kun Feixue
Ji Zihan as Bing Lin

Soundtrack

Ratings 

 Highest ratings are marked in red, lowest ratings are marked in blue

References

External links

2016 Chinese television series debuts
Chinese Paladin (TV series)
Xianxia television series
Chinese television shows based on video games
Demons in television
Television about magic
Television series set in Imperial China
Mandarin-language television shows
Television series by Tangren Media
Hunan Television dramas
2016 Chinese television series endings
Television series by Linmon Pictures
Live action television shows based on video games